This is a list of cities in Oceania by country.

Sovereign states

List of cities in Australia
List of cities, towns and villages in East Timor
List of cities and towns in Fiji
List of cities in Indonesia
List of cities and villages in Kiribati
List of cities in Papua New Guinea
List of cities in the Marshall Islands
Administrative divisions of the Federated States of Micronesia
List of cities in Nauru
List of cities in New Zealand
List of cities in Palau
List of cities, towns and villages in Samoa
List of cities, towns and villages in the Solomon Islands
List of cities in Tonga
List of villages and neighbourhoods in Tuvalu
List of cities in Vanuatu

Dependencies and other territories

Administrative divisions of American Samoa
List of settlements on Christmas Island
List of settlements in the Cocos (Keeling) Islands
List of villages and neighbourhoods in the Cook Islands
List of cities in French Polynesia
List of villages in Guam
List of places in Hawaii
List of cities in New Caledonia
List of villages in Niue
List of settlements in Norfolk Island
List of villages in the Northern Mariana Islands
List of settlements in the Pitcairn Islands
List of villages in Tokelau
List of cities in Wallis and Futuna

See also
List of cities in Oceania by population
Oceania
Lists of cities
Cities of present-day nations and states
 List of cities by continent
 List of cities in Africa
 List of cities in North America
 List of cities in South America
 List of cities in Asia
 List of cities in Europe
 
 

Oceania